The Forest was a railway station on the Crookwell railway line, New South Wales, Australia. The station opened in 1902 with the opening of the line, and consisted of a 100 ft platform on the down side of the line with a loop siding on the up side. It was named after an adjoining property named Forest Lodge. The platform was removed in 1969 and the loop closed in 1974 and was subsequently demolished. The line through The Forest closed to goods traffic in 1984.

References

Disused regional railway stations in New South Wales
Railway stations in Australia opened in 1902
Railway stations closed in 1974